The John S. Latsis Public Benefit Foundation, an independent, non profit organization, was established in 2005 with the aim of undertaking and supporting a variety of public benefit activities in the areas of science, education, culture, arts, social welfare, environmental protection etc. in Greece and abroad.

It is named after John Latsis (1910-2003), a Greek tycoon, whose various entrepreneurial activities in Greece and other countries all over the world were accompanied by public benefit work.

Mission 
The Foundation plans, manages, and funds programmes that cover a broad range of fields, such as education, science, arts and culture, social welfare and community development, in collaboration with civil society partners and key players within these areas. An additional, diversified branch of activities is the operation of the Neraida Floating Museum, which, by offering visitors free access and organising various events, seeks to highlight the maritime and entrepreneurial history of Greece, familiarise youth with the maritime profession, and promote environmental awareness.

Programs 
The Foundation makes grants across many issue areas, including education, science, culture and social welfare and community development. Since 2012, after the termination of John S. Latsis Ileians’ Scholarships Foundation activities, John S. Latsis Public Benefit Foundation undertook the implementation of undergraduate and postgraduate scholarships, continuing an action that started in 1967. To date, through the scholarships, approximately 2,000 undergraduate and postgraduate students have been supported.

Also, responding to current needs the Latsis Foundation designs and implements programs like the relief program for the relief of those affected by the August 2007 fires of Greece, the food distribution program for the relief of the vulnerable sectors of Greek society hardest hit by the effects of the 2009 fiscal crisis and other programs to support NGOs, innovative social initiative, educational programs etc.

References

External links 

 Official Website
 Neraida Floating Museum

Foundations based in Liechtenstein
Organizations established in 2005
2000s establishments in Liechtenstein
Charities based in Europe